Franco Nicola (born 14 June 1966) is an Argentine former field hockey player who competed in the 1988 Summer Olympics.

References

External links
 

1966 births
Living people
Argentine male field hockey players
Olympic field hockey players of Argentina
Field hockey players at the 1988 Summer Olympics
1990 Men's Hockey World Cup players
20th-century Argentine people
21st-century Argentine people